"Stranger in Moscow" is a song by American singer-songwriter Michael Jackson from his ninth studio album, HIStory (1995). The song was released as the sixth and final single worldwide on November 4, 1996 by Epic Records. It was not released in the United States until much later on July 7, 1997. The track was written in September 1993, while on the Dangerous World Tour stop in Moscow. An early version of the track's chord structure appears in the video game Sonic the Hedgehog 3; according to conflicting accounts, Jackson and his team composed music for the game before leaving the project or, choosing to stay uncredited for his work. 

The song's music video depicts the lives of six individuals, including Jackson, who are left isolated and disconnected from the world around them. "Stranger in Moscow" charted highly in the top 10 of numerous countries music charts worldwide, including Austria, the Czech Republic, Denmark, Hungary, Italy, New Zealand, Spain, Sweden, and the United Kingdom. However, it only peaked at number 91 on the Billboard Hot 100, becoming Jackson's lowest peaking on the chart. The song was performed on the HIStory World Tour in 1996–1997. The song has been covered a few times by other artists.

Background
"Stranger in Moscow", like several other HIStory tracks, was Jackson's response to recent events in his personal life. In 1993, the relationship between Jackson and the press soured entirely when he was accused of child sexual abuse. Though not charged with a crime, Jackson was intensely scrutinized by the media during the criminal investigation. Complaints about the coverage and media included using sensational headlines and headlines that implied guilt, accepting stories of Jackson's alleged criminal activity and leaked police material in exchange for money, deliberately using unflattering pictures of Jackson, and a lack of objectivity.

The coverage upset Jackson, and damaged his health; Jackson's health had deteriorated such that he canceled the remainder of his Dangerous World Tour and went into rehabilitation. The media showed him little sympathy. The Daily Mirror held a "Spot the Jacko" contest, offering readers a trip to Walt Disney World if they could correctly predict where the entertainer's next appearance would be. A Daily Express headline read, "Drug Treatment Star Faces Life on the Run", while a News of the World headline accused Jackson of being a fugitive. These tabloids also falsely alleged that Jackson had traveled to Europe to have cosmetic surgery that would make him unrecognizable upon return. Geraldo Rivera set up a mock trial, with a jury made up of audience members, even though Jackson had not been charged with a crime.

Music
Originally, HIStory was planned as a greatest hits album, with a few new tracks. However, Jackson and his collaborators were so pleased with the result of "Stranger in Moscow" that they decided to give HIStory a full studio album as the second disc.

"Stranger in Moscow" is an R&B ballad, written by Jackson in 1993 during his Dangerous World Tour stop in Moscow. It has a tempo of 67 beats per minute, making it one of Jackson's slowest songs. The instrumental portion is based on the credits theme of Sonic the Hedgehog 3, a 1994 video game which Jackson and his tour keyboardist Brad Buxer were hired to compose for. Conflicting accounts state that Jackson either dropped out of the project following the sexual abuse allegations around this time or, chose to be uncredited in-game because of his dissatisfaction with the limitations of the Sega Genesis sound chip.

According to keyboardist Brad Buxer, the song itself was inspired by one of the cues he had composed for Sonic the Hedgehog 3. He remembers being called up to Jackson's hotel room in Moscow on the Dangerous World Tour, thinking the latter wanted to hear his new game cues. Buxer played several songs on the piano in the room, among which was the Sonic the Hedgehog 3 credits theme cue (which would become the basis verse for "Stranger In Moscow"); he played it in a more song-like way and Michael loved it. He and Buxer then worked together on developing the chords and changes for the rest of the song over an hour and a half. While the track is an example of the collaborative process between the two, only Jackson received writing credit on the record, and Buxer did not push for credit. 

Guitars were played by Steve Lukather while keyboards, synthesizers and bass are credited to David Paich and Steve Porcaro. Jackson used Russian imagery and symbolism to underscore the track's sense of fear and alienation. It concludes with a narrative, spoken in Russian, by a KGB interrogator (Ed Wiesnieski). The narrative, translated into English is, "Why have you come from the west? Confess! To steal the great achievements of the people, the accomplishments of the workers..."

Critical reception
"Stranger in Moscow" received praise from music critics and producers. Stephen Thomas Erlewine of AllMusic noted of HIStory, "Jackson produces some well-crafted pop that ranks with his best material... 'Stranger in Moscow' is one of his most haunting ballads". Tom Molley of the Associated Press described it as an "ethereal and stirring description of a man wounded by a 'swift and sudden fall from grace' walking in the shadow of the Kremlin". Longtime collaborator  Bruce Swedien, has described "Stranger in Moscow" as one of the best songs Jackson had ever done. Fred Shuster of the Daily News of Los Angeles described it as, "a lush, pretty minor-key ballad with one of the album's catchiest choruses". Chris Willman of Los Angeles Times stated:  A reviewer from Music Week rated it five out of five, picking it as Single of the Week. The reviewer added, "More melodic than most of HIStorys new, uptempo tracks, this has a somewhat old-fashioned feel, being closer in spirit to Rock With You than Scream. It isn't quite vintage Jacko, but the song is irresistible." The magazine's Alan Jones stated that the Todd Terry remix "works like a dream, and guarantees Jackson another substantial hit." Jon Pareles of The New York Times stated, "The ballads are lavishly melodic. 'Stranger In Moscow', with odd lyrics like 'Stalin's tomb won't let me be,' has a beautiful chorus for the repeated question 'How does it feel?' ". Further praise came in 2005 when it was felt that the song had successfully portrayed "eerie loneliness" and was characterized as beautiful by Josephine Zohny of PopMatters. Rod Temperton, one of Jackson's songwriters from earlier in his career, believes that "Stranger in Moscow" is Jackson's best song. James Hunter of Rolling Stone commented: Patrick Macdonald of The Seattle Times described "Stranger in Moscow" as "a pretty ballad interspersed with sounds of rain." David Sinclair from The Times viewed it as "a dolorous ballad".

Music video

The song's accompanying music video, directed by photographer Nick Brandt, and filmed in Los Angeles, is focused around six unrelated people living in isolation in a cityscape on a dark, cloudy day while the rest of the world moves around them in slow motion (introducing the so-called 'bullet time' effect). The first half of the video introduces these figures. Five of the figures are: a bald man looking down at the city from his apartment window, a middle-aged woman sitting alone in a coffee shop, a homeless man lying on the damp street, a well-dressed man feeding pigeons, and a teenage boy ostracized from a street game of baseball. The sixth figure is Jackson himself, seen walking the city streets while he sings. Special effects are used to show birds and wasps flying, glass breaking and coffee spilling, all in slow motion.

In the second half of the scenario, heavy rain descends on the city and the citizens try to flee, all again seen in slow motion. From the safety of shelter, the six "strangers" watch everyone's futile attempts to avoid the sudden change in weather. Eventually, they decide to go outside, where they look up at the sky and allow the rain to soak them. The video ends with Michael whipping his hair. During this scene, a soft Russian voice is heard, a reference to Moscow.

The music video also appears on Jackson's video albums HIStory on Film, Volume II and Michael Jackson's Vision. It was published on YouTube in October 2009. The video has amassed more than 69 million views as of November 2022.

Jackson's biographer J. Randy Taraborrelli has stated that the video is based on Jackson's real life. He used to walk alone at night looking for new friends, even at the peak of his musical popularity. The 1980s saw him become deeply unhappy; Jackson, as a teenager, explained in an interview, "Even at home, I'm lonely. I sit in my room sometimes and cry. It's so hard to make friends... I sometimes walk around the neighborhood at night, just hoping to find someone to talk to. But I just end up coming home."Taraborrelli, p. 206

Live performances
The song was performed during HIStory World Tour (1996-1997).

Track listing

 UK CD single (6633525) "Stranger in Moscow" (Album Version) - 5.43
 "Stranger in Moscow" (Tee's Radio Mix) - 4.21
 "Stranger in Moscow" (Tee's In-House Club Mix) - 6.53
 "Stranger in Moscow" (TNT Frozen Sun Mix- Club) - 6.49
 "Stranger in Moscow" (Tee's Freeze Radio) - 3.45
 "Stranger in Moscow" (TNT Danger Dub) - 7.21
 "Stranger in Moscow" (Tee's Light AC Mix) - 4.24

 US 12" single "Stranger in Moscow (Hani's Num Club Mix)" – 10:15
 "Stranger in Moscow (TNT Danger Dub)" – 7:21
 "Stranger in Moscow (Basement Boys 12" Club Mix)" – 8:18
 "Blood on the Dance Floor (T&G Pool Of Blood Dub)" – 7:34

 US CD single'''
 "Stranger in Moscow (Tee's Radio Mix)" – 4:21
 "Stranger in Moscow (Charles Roane's Full R&B Mix)" – 4:40
 "Stranger in Moscow (Hani's Num Radio Mix)" – 3:50
 "Stranger in Moscow (Tee's In-House Club Mix)" – 6:54
 "Stranger in Moscow (Basement Boys 12" Club Mix)" – 8:18
 "Stranger in Moscow (Hani's Extended Chill Hop Mix)" – 6:01
 "Off the Wall (Junior Vasquez Remix)" – 5:14 

Personnel
As per the liner notes of The Ultimate Collection:
Lead and Background vocals by Michael Jackson
Guitar: Steve Lukather
Keyboards, Synthesizers & [Synth] bass: David Paich
Keyboards & Synthesizers: Steve Porcaro
Keyboards & Synthesizers, programming (uncredited): Brad Buxer
Michael Jackson Beatbox samples in intro spliced/edited by Andrew Scheps

Charts

Weekly charts

Year-end charts

Certifications

Cover versions
British singer Leona Lewis did a live rendition at the Michael Forever – The Tribute Concert
Kevin Parker released a cover by his Australian psychedelic rock music project Tame Impala on SoundCloud on March 12, 2014.
 The American rock band Santana have covered the song in their concerts and the cover was uploaded on Youtube on March 30, 2020.
 The Struts covered the song for their unplugged EP “Unplugged at EastWest.”

Notes

References
 
 George, Nelson (2004). Michael Jackson: The Ultimate Collection''. Sony BMG.
 
 

1990s ballads
1995 songs
1996 singles
1997 singles
Number-one singles in the Czech Republic
Number-one singles in Italy
Number-one singles in Spain
Michael Jackson songs
Songs written by Michael Jackson
Pop ballads
Contemporary R&B ballads
Song recordings produced by Michael Jackson
Songs about loneliness
Songs about Moscow
Black-and-white music videos
Music videos directed by Nick Brandt